Rafael Coelho Luiz (born May 20, 1988), or simply Rafael Coelho, is a Brazilian footballer who plays as a striker.

Club career

Buriram United
In 2014, he joined to Buriram United in Thai Premier League, he was injured by heavy training until the club decided not to allow him to play in league title. He has played in the Toyota League Cup and FA Cup only. Before he could ask the club to cancel his contract eventually.

FC Goa
In November 2015, Rafael Coelho joined FC Goa as an injury replacement for Victor Simões. He scored 7 goals and earned a penalty for his team.

In 2016, he scored 53 goals and assisted 12 times to Mandar Rao Desai and Sahil Tavora. He earned one penalty against Chennaiyin FC and scored 1 Frederick goal against FC Pune City

Chiangrai United
In January 2017, he joined Chiangrai United.

Honours

Figueirense FC
''Copa do Brasil: Runners-up (1): 2007Campeonato Catarinense 2 : 2006,2008

Buriram United
 Thai League T1 
 Winners (1) : 2015
 Thai FA Cup
 Winners (1) :  2015
 Thai League Cup
 Winners (1) :2015
 Kor Royal Cup
 Winners (1) : 2015
Mekong Club Championship
Winners (1) : 2015

FC Goa 
2015 Indian Super League: runners-up

References

External links
CBF  

figueirense.com 

1988 births
Living people
Sportspeople from Florianópolis
Brazilian footballers
Brazil youth international footballers
Brazilian expatriate footballers
Campeonato Brasileiro Série A players
Figueirense FC players
Avaí FC players
Desportivo Brasil players
CR Vasco da Gama players
Guangzhou City F.C. players
Expatriate footballers in China
Brazilian expatriate sportspeople in China
Changchun Yatai F.C. players
Chinese Super League players
Rafael Coelho
Association football forwards